A number of computer-assisted translation software and websites exists for various platforms and access types. According to a 2006 survey undertaken by Imperial College of 874 translation professionals from 54 countries, primary tool usage was reported as follows: Trados (35%), Wordfast (17%), Déjà Vu (16%), SDL Trados 2006 (15%), SDLX (4%),  (3%), OmegaT (3%), others (7%).

The list below includes only some of the existing available software and website platforms.

See also
Machine translation
Comparison of machine translation applications

References

Language software
Translation
Computer-assisted translation